Brandon Stadium, also known as Coventry Stadium, is located 6 miles east of Coventry in Brandon, Warwickshire, England. It was the home of the Coventry Bees motorcycle speedway team. It also hosted BriSCA F1 Stock Car Racing on the 1st Saturday of the month from April through to November. From 1978 until early 2016 it intermittently hosted greyhound racing. As of 2022, it is closed and has become dilapidated after several fires, including an arson attack.

Speedway

History
Brandon Stadium's first speedway meeting took place on 29 September 1928. The track was owned by Midland Sports Stadiums (who also owned Leicester Speedway) and Charles Ochiltree promoted the Speedway and Stock Car Racing until his death in 1998. His son Martin then carried on promoting duties until the stadium was sold to Avtar Sandhu in 2003. The stadium's capacity is approximately 12.500. The record attendance for Brandon stands at 24,000, and was set during a speedway meeting, the Brandonapolis of 1954 on a Thursday night, where they locked the gates and were turning away buses.

Brandon Stadium has been a popular stop for many high-profile speedway events in its lifetime. Under the old format of the Speedway World Championship events including the British Speedway Championship, the Commonwealth and Overseas Finals as well as hosting the 1998, 1999 and 2000 Speedway Grand Prix of Great Britain. The 'Brandonapolis' is an annual event at Brandon which features some of the world's best speedway riders. It was postponed in 2011 due to the BSPA dispute of the 2011 Elite League Season.

In 1991, Brandon Stadium staged the Under-21 World Championship Final which was won by Denmark's Brian Andersen who defeated fellow Dane Morten Andersen in a runoff after both finished on 14 points. Australia's Jason Lyons finished third, while the leading British rider Joe Screen finished in 5th place with 10 points.

The speedway also hosted the last Speedway World Team Cup Final in 2000 (won by Sweden) after having previously held the Final in 1993 won by the United States.

Speedway World Finals

World Team Cup
 1993 –  United States (Sam Ermolenko / Billy Hamill / Greg Hancock / Josh Larsen / Bobby Ott) – 40pts
 2000 –  Sweden (Tony Rickardsson / Peter Karlsson / Henrik Gustafsson / Mikael Karlsson / Niklas Klingberg) – 40pts

Individual Under-21 World Championship
 1991 –  Brian Andersen – 14+3pts

Speedway Grand Prix
 1998 Speedway Grand Prix of Great Britain –  Jason Crump
 1999 Speedway Grand Prix of Great Britain –  Tony Rickardsson
 2000 Speedway Grand Prix of Great Britain –  Martin Dugard

Sidecar Speedway
The three wheels where a regular visitor to Brandon Stadium with both team and individual meetings taking place. Th most prestigious meeting was te Gold Trophy, Sidecars World Cup in 2010 and the British Open Championship from 1996 to 1999.

Gold Trophy
 1998 Gold Trophy –  Mick Headland & Jesse Headland

British Open Championship
 1996 British Open Championship –  Roger Measor & Shane Lapham
 1997 British Open Championship –  Roger Measor & Shane Lapham
 1998 British Open Championship –  Paul Pinfold & Lisa Pinfold
 1997 British Open Championship –  John Halsey & Jason Glenie

Stock car racing

The speedway track was also used for BriSCA F1 Stock Cars, having raced here continuously since 1954. The first meeting was held on 30 June, the first heat being won by Percy 'Hellcat' Brine, he also won the meeting Final. The BriSCA Formula 1 Stock Cars World Championship has been held here many times since 1960. The track was also used for BriSCA Formula 2 Stock Cars, V8 Hotstox, and various other forms of oval Motorsport including Bangers, Saloon Stock Cars, Ministox and Sprint Cars.

The venue was set to host the BriSCA F2 World Championship for the first time in 2017, but this event had to be moved to The Adrian Flux Arena in King's Lynn due to Coventry Stadium's closure, which was poorly handled by the stadium owners.

Greyhound racing

Origins
The Sanderson family had the majority shareholding in Midland Sports since the end of the war. Charles Ochiltree was installed as the Managing Director of Coventry Stadium Ltd at Brandon despite only having a minor shareholding in the company. Alan Sanderson died in November 1968 resulting in Ochiltree becoming the dominant decision maker for the track and fourteen years after the closure of Lythalls Lane Stadium greyhound racing returned to Coventry in 1978.

History
The racing arrived shortly after a failed Barratts Homes bid for sister track Leicester Stadium fuelling speculation that it was to be a replacement for Leicester. The first meeting took place on 19 September 1978 and facilities included a restaurant, a modern computerised tote and bars. The circuit was all sand and the hare was an 'Outside McGee' and Ron Day was installed as General Manager with Geoff Hammond as Racing Manager. A competition called the Eclipse returned to its traditional Coventry roots one year later.

Leading trainers Geoff DeMulder, Barbara Tompkins and Natalie Savva all became attached to the track and DeMulder went on to win the Trainer of the Year. During 1980 Iskagh Ruler (Tompkins) reached the English Greyhound Derby final. General Manager Ron Day died whilst in South Africa in 1981 and Sean Doyle (son of trainer Paddy Doyle) the young Racing Manager who had joined Coventry at the end of 1980 from Cradley Heath lost a battle with cancer. Mick Wheble the Racing Manager at sister track Leicester was brought in as Racing and Operations Manager. Barbara Tompkins won the 1983 English Greyhound Derby for Coventry when Im Slippy was victorious at White City Stadium.

First closure 
Midland Sports finally sold sister track Leicester in 1984 to Barratts Homes and another Derby final appearance by a Tompkins trained runner (Murlens Slippy) was overshadowed by the imminent closure of the stadium to greyhound racing. It finished on 24 October 1986 but Ochiltree remained the
Speedway promoter.

Re-Opening 
Greyhounds returned in 2004, Simon Harris the Wimbledon Racing Manager was recruited at the end of 2003,the track was relaid in time for an April 2004 start. New kennels were built for the racing schedule of Wednesday, Friday and Saturday evening racing. The track received more good news when it was awarded the 2004 Trainers championship. Matt Dartnall trained two hounds through to the 2009 English Greyhound Derby final.

Subsequent closures and re-opening 
After Boxing Day 2009 the company went into liquidation and closed. Just three years later the well-known professional gambler and owner Harry Findlay re-opened Coventry until 2014 when it shut once again. Independent racing (unaffiliated to a governing body) then took place until January 2016.

Track records

Arson attack 
In May 2022, the stadium caught fire, causing substantial damage to the grounds, with firefighters taking four hours to extinguish the fire. The cause was revealed as arson. Several months before the incident, an anonymous urban explorer had noted security concerns at the site that left it vulnerable to attack, and Brandon Estates had been previously accused of failing to keep the site secure.

References

External links
 The Official Coventry Bees website
 The Official Coventry Stox website
 
 The Official BriSCA F1 website
 The Official BriSCA F2 website

Sport in Coventry
Speedway Elite League teams
Sports venues in Warwickshire
Defunct speedway venues in England
Defunct greyhound racing venues in the United Kingdom
Buildings and structures in the United Kingdom destroyed by arson